Aakasha Ganga 2 is 2019 Indian Malayalam-language horror thriller film written and directed by Vinayan. It is a sequel to his 1999 film Aakasha Ganga. The film stars Ramya Krishna, Veena Nair, Vishnu Vinay and Sreenath Bhasi in the lead roles. The film's soundtrack and score by Bijibal and cinematographer by Prakash Kutty. The film was produced by Vinayan under the banner of Akash Films. It was shot in Ottapalam, Cochin and Pondicherry.
The film failed at the box office.

Plot 
Twenty years after the incident at the Maanikaseri Kovilakam, several members of the family have now died, leaving behind Unnikrishnan Varma/Unni, his sister (Oppol) and his only daughter Arathi Varma.  An atheist and rationalist, Arathi is a medical student who hangs around with her close friends Jithu, Titus and Gopi, who is also her lover. One day, the friends come across an ashram that is headed by Soumini Devi, a tantrik ritualist who specialises in dark spells and black magic. Arathi decides to test the authenticity of the claims of the ashram, so she is allowed to make contact with the soul of her deceased mother, Maya/Daisy, who died after childbirth. The soul further tells her about a bracelet that she intended to give her newborn daughter, made by her great-grandmother, after Arathi would be born. Out of curiosity, Arathi searches of the bracelet, which leads to a forbidden temple that contained the evil soul of Ganga, the maid who was killed mercilessly by the male members of the Maanikaseri family decades ago. Arathi accidentally releases the soul, leading to several paranormal incidents in the house. Out of fear, the four friends decide to meet Meppadan Thirumeni, the exorcist who subdued the evil spirit previously, at his house but find out that he has died too. Eventually, they contact Soumini Devi, the estranged daughter of Meppadan, about the strange problems. Soumini Devi tells that it was the spirit of Ganga who was causing the current problems. She also tells them that after the spirit was exorcised from Arathi's mother's body, several members of the family died after Arathi's birth due to this spirit. So Meppadan used his tantric powers to imprison the evil soul, this time inside the family's temple and told the family members to not open its doors. The spirit was now targeting Arathi, intending to kill her on the new moon night of 31 July. Before that time, the spirit must be subdued. However, the spirit causes more trouble and eventually possesses Arathi. After this, Unni gets killed by the soul, thereby avenging for the actions caused by his ancestors leading to Ganga's death. Soon, an exorcism is arranged by Soumini Devi along with the help of Ananthan Thirumeni, the disciple of Meppadan. They successfully remove the spirit from Arathi's body before time, with Thirumeni promising her that the spirit would never come near her again. While Arathi and her friends leave home, Soumini Devi is attacked and killed by the spirit. The fate of the spirit as well as the family members affected by it, to this day remains unknown.

Cast

Mayoori as Ganga/Spirit (Recreated version)
Veena P Nair as Arathi Varma
Ramya Krishna as Soumini Devi
Sreenath Bhasi as Titus 
Vishnu Vinay as Gopi Krishnan
Vishnu Govindan as Jithu
Riyaz as Unnikrishna Varma Thampuran
Senthil Krishna as SI T.Balaraman
Salim Kumar as Joseph/ Anatomy Professor 
Hareesh Kanaran as Dr.Damu (Medical College Principal)
Dharmajan Bolgatty as Bharathan 
Hareesh Peradi as Ananthan Thirumeni
Sunil Sukhada as Swami Chinmayi
Saju Kodiyan as Bus Driver
Praveena as Oppol
Thesni Khan as Sundari  Bharathan's wife
Valsala Menon as Kausalya Antharjanam
Saranya Anand(Dual role) as 
Burnt Ganga (spirit)
Collage teacher
Kanakalatha – Daisy's mother
Idavela Babu - Unni's friend, Ravi

Photo Archive 
Kalpana as Aaveshananda Swamigal
Divya Unni as Maya/Daisy
Jagadish as Krishnan Thampuran
Innocent as Ramavarma Thampuran
Sukumari as Maanikkasseri Thampuratti
Spadikam George as Maanikkasseri Thampuran

Production

Development 
Vinayan announced Aakasha Ganga 2 on his Facebook page on 4 March 2019. Vinayan himself launched the title poster. On 4 March 2019, The Times of India had reported that Vinayan divulges about Aakasha Ganga sequel. Film produced by Vinayan under the banner of Aakash Films.

Filming 
The Filming started in Palakkad on 24 April 2019. Cinematographer Prakash Kutty, music composers Bijibal, Lyricist Hari Narayanan and Rameshan Nair joined the crew initially. Ramya Krishnan was confirmed central character for the film. Other primary filming locations were Kannur and Palani, Tamil Nadu.

Soundtrack 
Bijibal composed the film's music and Berny-Ignatius remake song "Puthumazhayayi vannu ne" from first part. The lyrics were written by Harinarayanan and Rameshan Nair.

References

External links
 

2019 films
Indian horror thriller films
2019 horror thriller films
Films scored by Bijibal
Films scored by Berny–Ignatius
2010s Malayalam-language films
Indian sequel films
Films shot in Palakkad
Films shot in Ottapalam
Films shot in Palani
Films shot in Kochi
Films directed by Vinayan
Malayalam films in series